Charles Steiner may refer to:
 Charles Zentai (1921–2017), born Károly Steiner, Hungarian-Australian accused of war crimes
 Charley Steiner (born 1949), US sportscaster